Tajaraq or Tajaroq may refer to:
 Tajaraq, Ardabil
 Tajaraq, Ajab Shir, East Azerbaijan Province
 Tajaroq, Meyaneh, East Azerbaijan Province
 Tajaroq, alternate name of Tajareh Rud, Meyaneh County, East Azerbaijan Province